Aslak Dørum (born 7 August 1964 in Oslo, Norway) is a Norwegian writer and bassist of the Norwegian rock band DumDum Boys.

Career 

Dørum joined DumDum Boys in 1993, after having been closely associated with them for years, and been responsible for the band's videos. He immediately became a song writer for the band, and alongside Kjartan Kristiansen, won the Spellemannprisen 2009 in the class 'Text writer of the year', for the lyrics to the DumDum Boys album Tidsmaskin (2009).

Dørum released his debut solo album Lonesome Means Happy in 2005, and in 2013 he debuted as a novelist with the adventure novel "En flåte av gull" (A fleet of gold).

Honors 
2009: Spellemannprisen in the class text writer of the year, for the lyrics to the DumDum Boys album Tidsmaskin

Discography

Solo albums 
2005: Lonesome Means Happy (Bauta Recordings )

Collaborations 
With Follow That Dream
1987: Fishing For Success (Thank You Sir May I Have Another Record)
1988: Follow That Dream (Thank You Sir May I Have Another Record)

With DumDum Boys
1994: Ludium (Oh Yeah!)
1994: 1001 Watt (Oh Yeah!)
1996: Sus (Oh Yeah!)
1997: Stjernesludd (Oh Yeah!)
1998: Totem (Oh Yeah!)
2006: Gravitasjon (Oh Yeah!)
2009: Tidsmaskin (Oh Yeah!)
2012: Ti Liv (Oh Yeah!)

With Racer
1995: Kan Det Være Nødvendig Å Være Så Sint? (Oh No!)
1998: Bønda Fra Nord (Oh No!)
2000: Bønda Fra Nord 2000 (Oh No!)

With Blister
2003: Brand New Antiques (Blister Records)
2008: Birthdaysongs (Blister Records)

With other projects
2004: Full House (Bergen Records), with Karin Wright
2005: Frolic (Capitol Records), with Anneli Drecker on "Strange Little Bird"
2006: Desembernatt (CD-R), with Torill Beate Nilsen and Renate Grimsbø Kulbrandstad

References

External links 
Aslak Dørum at Aschehoug (in Norwegian)
Så spennende at jeg glemmer å puste on Debutantbloggen (in Norwegian)

1964 births
Living people
Musicians from Oslo
Norwegian writers
20th-century Norwegian bass guitarists
21st-century Norwegian bass guitarists
20th-century Norwegian multi-instrumentalists
21st-century Norwegian multi-instrumentalists
Norwegian male bass guitarists
DumDum Boys members
Norwegian multi-instrumentalists
20th-century bass guitarists
21st-century Norwegian guitarists
20th-century Norwegian male musicians
21st-century Norwegian male musicians